Bhullatal, an artificial manmade lake dedicated to the Garhwali youth of The Garhwal Rifles who helped in construction of the lake, located at just 1 km from the Lansdowne, India.

Bhulla in Garhwali language means younger brother. Bhullatal is also known as Bhulla Lake.

Other attractions
There is ample boating facility at the lake with some ducks.

Gallery

See also
 Lansdowne, India
 Nainital
 Bhimtal Lake
 Lakes of Kumaon hills
 Tarkeshwar Mahadev

References

External links 
 Official website of Uttarakhand Government

Lakes of Uttarakhand